Edward John Vande Berg (born October 26, 1958) is an American former professional left-handed baseball pitcher.

Career
Berg is an alumnus of Redlands High School and Arizona State University.

Drafted by the Seattle Mariners in the 13th round of the 1980 Major League Baseball (MLB) draft, Vande Berg would make his MLB debut with the Mariners on April 7, 1982, and appear in his final MLB game on September 30, 1988.

References

External links

Retrosheet
Venezuelan Professional Baseball League

1958 births
Living people
American expatriate baseball players in Canada
American people of Dutch descent
Arizona State Sun Devils baseball players
Baseball players from California
Bellingham Mariners players
Calgary Cannons players
Cleveland Indians players
Dubois County Dragons players
Iowa Cubs players
Los Angeles Dodgers players
Leones del Caracas players
American expatriate baseball players in Venezuela
Major League Baseball pitchers
Major League Baseball replacement players
Oklahoma City 89ers players
People from Redlands, California
Seattle Mariners players
Spokane Indians players
Texas Rangers players
United States national baseball team players
Alaska Goldpanners of Fairbanks players